Cedar Grove is a former plantation in Natchez, Adams County, Mississippi.

Location
It is located in South East Natchez.

History
The mansion was built in the 1850s for Absalom Sharp (1824-1851), a prominent cotton merchant from New Jersey. Additionally, he owned up to 900 acres of cotton fields and farmland. Whereas upstairs there used to be a ballroom, it was reconverted into bedrooms as well as a dining-room and a study in the 1870s.

It has been listed on the National Register of Historic Places since March 19, 1982. It now serves as a bed & breakfast.

References

Houses on the National Register of Historic Places in Mississippi
Houses in Natchez, Mississippi
Bed and breakfasts in Mississippi
National Register of Historic Places in Natchez, Mississippi